Overrun is a 2021 American action crime comedy film directed by Josh Tessier, and starring Omid Zader, Johnny Messner, Bruce Dern, William Katt, Nicholas Turturro and Chris Tallman. It is Tessier's feature directorial debut. It is also an expansion of Zader and Tessier's 2013 short film Raw Brute.

Plot 
Marcus Lombardi (Zader) is an ex-military extraction specialist whose sister is exposed as an informant for Ray Barren (Miano), a criminal kingpin.

Cast
Omid Zader as Marcus Lombardi
Johnny Messner as Detective Blake Finning
Bruce Dern as Arkadi Dubkova
William Katt as Detective Ed Dobbs
Nicholas Turturro as Doc
Chris Tallman as Detective James Walsh
Chelsey Goldsmith as Reyna Lombardi
Jack Griffo as Auggy Riggs
Christopher Troy as Boka

Release
The film was released on video on demand (VOD) and digital platforms on August 17, 2021.  Then it was released on DVD and Blu-ray on November 16, 2021.

Reception
Alan Ng of Film Threat rated the film a 7.5 out of 10. In his review, Ng concluded by saying if the "story was less jokey and the plot less complicated, it might have moved the needle higher for me, but in the end, it’s a solid film with good performances all around.

References

External links
 
 

2020s English-language films